Pardosa occidentalis is a wolf spider species found in Portugal, France and Sardinia.

See also 
 List of Lycosidae species

References

External links 

occidentalis
Spiders of Europe
Spiders described in 1881